Malaysia participated in the 2013 World Games in Cali, Colombia on July 25, 2013 to August 4, 2013. Malaysia took one gold medal in squash.

Squash

Women's singles

Note: * w/d = Withdraw, * w/o = Walkover, * r = Retired

References

Nations at the 2013 World Games
2013
2013 in Malaysian sport